Hebeloma helodes is a species of mushroom in the family Hymenogastraceae.

helodes
Fungi of Europe